Etienne Nestor Ys (born 26 February 1962) is a Curaçaoan politician who served as the 23rd and 26th Prime Minister of the Netherlands Antilles from  2002 to 2003 and again from 2004 to 2006. He previously served as Minister of Finance from 1994 to 1995.

Ys was born in Curaçao on 26 
February 1962. Ys studied law at the Groningen University and graduated in 1985. Following his graduation he worked as a tax inspector at the Dutch Revenue Services "belastingdienst". he went on to serve as Minister of Finance of the Netherlands Antilles from 1994–1995, and then commissioner of the island territory of Curaçao.

following the 2017 Curaçao general election he was appointed as informateur. following the formation of the new government, he was appointed as chairman of the board of the Central Bank of Curaçao and Sint Maarten

References

1962 births
Living people
Prime Ministers of the Netherlands Antilles
Party for the Restructured Antilles politicians